Angelika Sher (born 1969) is a Lithuanian-born Israeli photographer.

Biography 
Angelika Sher was born in Vilna, Lithuania. She immigrated  to Israel in 1990. She has earned a BA degree in radiography and natural science from Bar-Ilan University, where she has studied from 1991 to 1995.  In 2002–2005 Sher studied at the College of Photography in Kiryat Ono, followed by a two-year program at Bezalel Academy of Art and Design in Jerusalem (2007–2008).
Angelika Sher is married to Vladimir Lumberg, a musician and a producer of the music band "Jewrhythmics", and a mother of three.  She lives and works in Israel.

Art career 
Soon after graduation from the College of Photography in Kiryat Ono, where she met Pesi Girsch, her teacher and mentor, Sher had her first solo exhibition at the Ramat Gan Museum. Sher has exhibited her photography in Israel, Italy and Denmark, at the Moscow Biennale, and in Czech Republic. A solo exhibition of her work opened in New York in January 2015. Sher also participated in Animanix Biennale and International Photography Festival in Tel Aviv. She won the 2009 Sony World Photography Awards, Professional, 3rd Place: Fine Art—Conceptual and Constructed. Sher also engaged in photography projects with the Gesher Theater and mentally-challenged people at Beit Issie Shapiro.

In October 2010 a photograph from her series "Growing Down" was sold by the Philips De Pury auction house in a New York Photography auction.

In 2014 Kehrer Verlag published a book of her work "Angelika Sher – Series, 2005–2012".

Solo exhibitions
 
 2007 "My Mother's Fur Coat", Ramat Gan Museum, Israel
 2009 "Inside my Life", Reartuno gallery, Brescia, Italy
 2009 "Inside my Life", Reartuno gallery, Brescia, Italy
 2009 "13", Pobeda gallery, Moscow, as part of 3d Moscow Biennale of Contemporary Art 
 2009 "Twilight Sleep", Fotografiya gallery, Ljubljana, Slovenia
 2009 "13", Tavi Dresdner Gallery, Tel Aviv, Israel
 2010 "Twilight Sleep",Tavi Dresdner gallery, Tel Aviv, Israel
 2011 "Survival", solo show as part of Tina B Biennale at Galerie Vernon, Prague
 2012 "Twilight Sleep", Camera 16, Milan
 2012 "History of the Beauty", Zemack gallery, Tel Aviv
 2014 "Fifth Column". Zemack Gallery, Tel Aviv
 2015 "Disturbing Beauty". Sepia EYE Gallery, New York City

Selected group exhibitions 

 2007 "Environment Love", New Gallery Jerusalem, Israel
 2008 "Presence of the Sea", Cinema Center, Tel Aviv, Israel
 2008 "Dirty White", Contemporary Art Space gallery, Tel Aviv,
 2008 "Growing Down", Presentation of new series, Bezalel Academy of Arts and Design, Jerusalem, Israel
 2008 "Awakening the tiger", Contemporary Art Space Gallery, Tel Aviv, Israel 
 2008 "Everything is Dynamic", Tiroche Gallery, Yafo, Israel
 2008 "Goim", New Gallery, Jerusalem, Israel 
 2009 Animanix Biennale 2009–2010 Venues: Museum of Contemporary Art, Shanghai, Taipei and Kaohsiung, Today Art Museum, Beijing.
 2009 1st Israeli Festival of Photography, Tel Aviv, Israel
 2009 StArt exhibition, Tel Aviv, Israel 
 2009 "The Intimate Line", Sepia EYE Gallery, New York
 2010 "Moments of Home", special project with mentally challenged people, Tel Aviv port, Israel
 2010 "Survival", Tavi Dresdner Gallery, Tel Aviv, Israel
 2009 2010 Sony WPA World tour: Hong Kong, Tokyo, Toronto, Paris, New York, Bangkok, Mexico City, London, Berlin, Kuala Lumpur
 2010 Haifa International Mediterranean Biennale of Contemporary Art
 2011 "Photopoetica", Musrara School of Photography (Naggar School of Photography), Jerusalem
 2011 "Toys", Tel Aviv port
 2011 French Cultural Center, Haifa
 2011 "Safe place", Municipal Art Gallery of Rishon LeZion
 2011 Artists' House, Tel Aviv
 2011 Ramat Gan Museum Israel
 2011 "The Coming Community", Haifa Museum of Art
 2012 "What is real?", ME Contemporary Art, Copenhagen, Denmark
 2013 2nd Mediterranean Biannale of Contemporary Art, Sahnin, Israel
 2014 3d International Photography Festival (Israel), Rishon LeZion, Israel
 2015 "Hiwar", The Arab Museum of Contemporary Art, Sahnin, Israel
 2017 3nd Mediterranean Biannale of Contemporary Art, Sahnin, Israel 
 2017 "Odessa - Tel Aviv". International Photography Festival (Israel), Tel Aviv, Israel.

See also
Visual arts in Israel

References

External links 
 Official Website
Esa Epstein "Angelika Sher Series 2005 – 2012"
Kristin Haug "Kinder in Israel: Sie müssen lernen, ihre Angst zu beherrschen" Spigel Online
Angelika Sher on Amazon – Angelika Sher – Series, 2005–2012 Hardcover – 18 September 2014
Angelika Sher at Haifa Museum of Art
Angelika Sher on Artnet
Angelika Sher on Sepia EYE
Angelika Sher on  Zemack Gallery of Art
Angelika Sher on Musee

Israeli photographers
Israeli people of Lithuanian-Jewish descent
Israeli women photographers
1969 births
Living people